Suzie Muirhead (born Suzie Ngaire Pearce, 10 April 1975 in Whangarei) is a field hockey defender who was a member of the New Zealand team which finished sixth at the 2000 Summer Olympics in Sydney. She also competed with The Black Sticks at the 1998 and the 2002 Commonwealth Games, and at the 2004 Summer Olympics in Athens, where the team also finished sixth.

International senior competitions
 1998 – Commonwealth Games, Kuala Lumpur
 1998 – World Cup, Utrecht
 1999 – Champions Trophy, Brisbane
 2000 – Olympic Qualifying Tournament, Milton Keynes
 2000 – Champions Trophy, Amstelveen
 2000 – Summer Olympics, Sydney
 2001 – Champions Trophy, Amstelveen
 2002 – Commonwealth Games, Manchester
 2002 – Champions Trophy, Macau
 2002 – World Cup, Perth
 2003 – Champions Challenge, Catania
 2004 – Olympic Qualifying Tournament, Auckland
 2004 – Summer Olympics, Athens
 2005 – Champions Challenge, Virginia Beach
 2006 – Commonwealth Games, Melbourne
 2006 – World Cup Qualifier, Rome

References

External links

New Zealand female field hockey players
Olympic field hockey players of New Zealand
Field hockey players at the 1998 Commonwealth Games
Field hockey players at the 2000 Summer Olympics
Field hockey players at the 2002 Commonwealth Games
Field hockey players at the 2004 Summer Olympics
Field hockey players at the 2006 Commonwealth Games
1975 births
Living people
Field hockey players from Whangārei
Commonwealth Games bronze medallists for New Zealand
Commonwealth Games medallists in field hockey
Medallists at the 1998 Commonwealth Games